The 2011 4 Nations Cup was a women's ice hockey tournament that was held in Nyköping, Sweden. All matches were held at the Stora Hallen arena. The November 10 match between Canada and the US marked the 100th time since 1990 that the two countries have played each other.

Schedule

Medal round

Bronze medal game

Gold medal game

Rosters
Canadian skaters Mélodie Daoust, Laura Fortino, Stefanie McKeough, Cassandra Poudrier and Lauriane Rougeau all suited up for Canada's National Women's Team for the first time in their respective careers.

Canada

Awards and honors
Monique Lamoureux-Kolls, U.S. Player of the Game in Gold Medal match
Kacey Bellamy, Best Defenseman
Kelli Stack, Best Forward
Jessie Vetter, Most Valuable Player

References

2011–12
2011–12 in Finnish ice hockey
2011–12 in Swedish ice hockey
2011–12 in Canadian women's ice hockey
2011–12 in American women's ice hockey
2011–12
2011–12 in women's ice hockey